The 1995–96 NBA season was the 28th season for the Seattle SuperSonics in the National Basketball Association. During the off-season, the Sonics acquired shooting guards Hersey Hawkins and David Wingate from the Charlotte Hornets, and re-acquired Frank Brickowski from the Sacramento Kings. The team returned to what had now become the KeyArena at Seattle Center after spending the previous season in the Tacoma Dome, while the KeyArena was being renovated. After two consecutive playoffs appearances losing in the first round, the Sonics got off to a 9–6 start in November, but later on posted a 14-game winning streak between February and March, then won nine straight games between March and April. The team held a 34–12 record at the All-Star break, then won 30 of their final 36 games afterwards to finish the regular season with a franchise best 64–18 record, surpassing the record from the 1993–94 season, and earned their third number one seed in the Western Conference in franchise history. They also posted a 38–3 record at home, which was second best in the league.

Point guard and Defensive Player of the Year Gary Payton, and power forward Shawn Kemp were both selected for the 1996 NBA All-Star Game, with head coach George Karl coaching the Western Conference. Both players were also selected to the All-NBA Second Team. Payton was named to the NBA All-Defensive First Team, averaging 19.3 points, 7.5 assists and 2.9 steals per game, and became the first and only point guard ever to win the Defensive Player of the Year award, while Kemp led the team with 19.6 points, 11.4 rebounds and 1.6 blocks per game. Payton also finished in sixth place in Most Valuable Player voting, while Kemp finished in eighth place. In addition, Detlef Schrempf averaged 17.1 points, 5.2 rebounds and 4.4 assists per game, but only played 63 games due to a knee injury, while Hawkins provided the team with 15.6 points and 1.8 steals per game, sixth man Sam Perkins provided with 11.8 points and 4.5 rebounds per game, and starting center Ervin Johnson contributed 5.5 points, 5.3 rebounds and 1.6 blocks per game. Also off the bench, Vincent Askew averaged 8.4 points per game, and defensive guard Nate McMillan contributed 5.0 points, 3.6 assists and 1.7 steals per game. This Sonics team is regarded as one of the best defensive teams in the late 90s.

Led by Kemp and Payton, the two formed "Sonic Boom", one of the most electrifying tandems in NBA history. In the playoffs, the SuperSonics faced the 8th-seeded Sacramento Kings in the Western Conference First Round. Despite losing Game 2 at home, 90–81, the Sonics defeated the Kings in four games, advancing to the second round for the first time in three years. In the Western Conference Semi-finals, they swept the 5th-seeded and reigning champions Houston Rockets in four straight games to advance to the Western Conference Finals, where they defeated the Utah Jazz in seven games to reach their first NBA Finals since 1979. 

In the Finals, they would face off against the Chicago Bulls, who posted the league's best record at 72–10, and were led by Michael Jordan, Scottie Pippen and Dennis Rodman. After an 0–3 start in the series, Seattle managed to win their next two home games, but eventually lost the series in Game 6 in Chicago. Following the season, Johnson signed as a free agent with the Denver Nuggets, while Askew was traded to the New Jersey Nets, and Brickowski signed with the Boston Celtics. This Sonics team has been featured in the video game series NBA 2K.

For the season, the Sonics featured a new primary logo of a dark green oval with the Space Needle forming the letter "I" in Sonics, plus adding new uniforms, and added dark green and red to their color scheme. The logo and uniforms would both remain in use until 2001.

Draft picks

Roster

Regular season

Season standings

Record vs. opponents

Game log

Season Synopsis

November
The SuperSonics started their season on November 3 on the road wherein they faced the Utah Jazz in Salt Lake City. They started the game well after leading the Jazz in the 1st Quarter, but the Jazz fought back and never looked back as they defeated the Sonics, 112-94. The Sonics now went back home to play the two Los Angeles teams, the Los Angeles Lakers and the L.A. Clippers. The SuperSonics won both of their home games, as they were now up 2-1 for the season. On November 26, the SuperSonics hosted the Michael Jordan-led Chicago Bulls. The visiting Bulls hold a double-digit lead at halftime but the Sonics fought back and only allowed 28 2nd half PTS for the Bulls as they won the game, 97-92. The month of November for the Sonics ended in a disappointing way because they were defeated by a point by the visiting Indiana Pacers led by Reggie Miller. Overall, the Sonics posted a record of 9-6 in 15 games played during that month.

Playoffs

|- align="center" bgcolor="#ccffcc"
| 1
| April 26
| Sacramento
| W 97–85
| Gary Payton (29)
| Ervin Johnson (10)
| Gary Payton (9)
| KeyArena17,072
| 1–0
|- align="center" bgcolor="#ffcccc"
| 2
| April 28
| Sacramento
| L 81–90
| Shawn Kemp (21)
| Shawn Kemp (8)
| Gary Payton (7)
| KeyArena17,072
| 1–1
|- align="center" bgcolor="#ccffcc"
| 3
| April 30
| @ Sacramento
| W 96–89
| Sam Perkins (17)
| Shawn Kemp (9)
| Gary Payton (7)
| ARCO Arena17,317
| 2–1
|- align="center" bgcolor="#ccffcc"
| 4
| May 2
| @ Sacramento
| W 101–87
| Gary Payton (29)
| Detlef Schrempf (10)
| Detlef Schrempf (9)
| ARCO Arena17,317
| 3–1
|-

|- align="center" bgcolor="#ccffcc"
| 1
| May 4
| Houston
| W 108–75
| Gary Payton (28)
| Shawn Kemp (12)
| Gary Payton (7)
| KeyArena17,072
| 1–0
|- align="center" bgcolor="#ccffcc"
| 2
| May 6
| Houston
| W 105–101
| Detlef Schrempf (21)
| Schrempf, Kemp (10)
| Schrempf, Payton (5)
| KeyArena17,072
| 2–0
|- align="center" bgcolor="#ccffcc"
| 3
| May 10
| @ Houston
| W 115–112
| Gary Payton (28)
| Shawn Kemp (18)
| Gary Payton (8)
| The Summit16,285
| 3–0
|- align="center" bgcolor="#ccffcc"
| 4
| May 12
| @ Houston
| W 114–107 (OT)
| Shawn Kemp (32)
| Shawn Kemp (15)
| Gary Payton (11)
| The Summit16,611
| 4–0
|-

|- align="center" bgcolor="#ccffcc"
| 1
| May 18
| Utah
| W 102–72
| Payton, Kemp (21)
| Shawn Kemp (11)
| Gary Payton (7)
| KeyArena17,072
| 1–0
|- align="center" bgcolor="#ccffcc"
| 2
| May 20
| Utah
| W 91–87
| Gary Payton (18)
| Nate McMillan (5)
| Gary Payton (8)
| KeyArena17,072
| 2–0
|- align="center" bgcolor="#ffcccc"
| 3
| May 24
| @ Utah
| L 76–96
| Gary Payton (25)
| Payton, Hawkins (6)
| Gary Payton (3)
| Delta Center19,911
| 2–1
|- align="center" bgcolor="#ccffcc"
| 4
| May 26
| @ Utah
| W 88–86
| Gary Payton (19)
| Shawn Kemp (8)
| Gary Payton (6)
| Delta Center19,911
| 3–1
|- align="center" bgcolor="#ffcccc"
| 5
| May 28
| Utah
| L 95–98 (OT)
| Gary Payton (31)
| Shawn Kemp (13)
| Gary Payton (6)
| KeyArena17,072
| 3–2
|- align="center" bgcolor="#ffcccc"
| 6
| May 30
| @ Utah
| L 83–118
| Shawn Kemp (26)
| Shawn Kemp (14)
| Gary Payton (7)
| Delta Center19,911
| 3–3
|- align="center" bgcolor="#ccffcc"
| 7
| June 2
| Utah
| W 90–86
| Shawn Kemp (26)
| Shawn Kemp (14)
| Gary Payton (5)
| KeyArena17,072
| 4–3
|-

|- align="center" bgcolor="#ffcccc"
| 1
| June 5
| @ Chicago
| L 90–107
| Shawn Kemp (32)
| Gary Payton (10)
| Gary Payton (6)
| United Center24,544
| 0–1
|- align="center" bgcolor="#ffcccc"
| 2
| June 7
| @ Chicago
| L 88–92
| Shawn Kemp (29)
| Shawn Kemp (13)
| Payton, Schrempf (3)
| United Center24,544
| 0–2
|- align="center" bgcolor="#ffcccc"
| 3
| June 9
| Chicago
| L 86–108
| Detlef Schrempf (20)
| Payton, Brickowski (7)
| Gary Payton (9)
| KeyArena17,072
| 0–3
|- align="center" bgcolor="#ccffcc"
| 4
| June 12
| Chicago
| W 107–86
| Shawn Kemp (25)
| Shawn Kemp (11)
| Gary Payton (11)
| KeyArena17,072
| 1–3
|- align="center" bgcolor="#ccffcc"
| 5
| June 14
| Chicago
| W 89–78
| Gary Payton (23)
| Shawn Kemp (10)
| Gary Payton (6)
| KeyArena17,072
| 2–3
|- align="center" bgcolor="#ffcccc"
| 6
| June 16
| @ Chicago
| L 75–87
| Detlef Schrempf (23)
| Shawn Kemp (14)
| Gary Payton (7)
| United Center24,544
| 2–4
|-

Player statistics

Season

Playoffs

Awards and records

Awards
 Gary Payton was named the Defensive Player of the Year and led the league in total steals and steals per game.

All-NBA Teams
 Shawn Kemp – All-NBA Second Team
 Gary Payton – All-NBA Second Team

NBA All-Defensive Teams
 Gary Payton – All-Defensive First Team

1996 NBA All-Star Game
 Shawn Kemp (fourth appearance, second start)
 Gary Payton (third appearance)

Records

Transactions

Trades

Free agents

Additions

Subtractions

Player Transactions Citation:

See also
 1995–96 NBA season

References

Seattle SuperSonics seasons
Western Conference (NBA) championship seasons